The South Carolina Declaration of Secession, formally known as the Declaration of the Immediate Causes Which Induce and Justify the Secession of South Carolina from the Federal Union, was a proclamation issued on December 24, 1860, by the government of South Carolina to explain its reasons for seceding from the United States. It followed the brief Ordinance of Secession that had been issued on December 20. The declaration is a product of a convention organized by the state's government in the month following the election of Abraham Lincoln as U.S. President, where it was drafted in a committee headed by Christopher Memminger. The declaration stated the primary reasoning behind South Carolina's declaring of secession from the U.S., which was described as "increasing hostility on the part of the non-slaveholding States to the Institution of Slavery". The Declaration states, in part, "A geographical line has been drawn across the Union, and all the States north of that line have united in the election of a man to the high office of President of the United States, whose opinions and purposes are hostile to slavery."

Background

An official secession convention met in South Carolina following the November 1860 election of Abraham Lincoln as President of the United States, on a platform opposing the expansion of slavery into U.S. territories. On December 20, 1860, the convention issued an ordinance of secession announcing the state's withdrawal from the union. The ordinance was brief and legalistic in nature, containing no explanation of the reasoning behind the delegates' decision:

The convention had previously agreed to draft a separate statement that would summarize their justification and gave that task to a committee of seven members comprising Christopher G. Memminger (considered the primary author), F. H. Wardlaw, R. W. Barnwell, J. P. Richardson, B. H. Rutledge, J. E. Jenkins, and P. E. Duncan. The document they produced, the Declaration of the Immediate Causes Which Induce and Justify the Secession of South Carolina from the Federal Union, was adopted by the convention on December 24.

Synopsis
The opening portion of the declaration outlines the historical background of South Carolina and offers a legal justification for its secession. It asserts that the right of states to secede is implicit in the Constitution and this right was explicitly reaffirmed by South Carolina in 1852. The declaration states that the agreement between South Carolina and the United States is subject to the law of compact, which creates obligations on both parties and which revokes the agreement if either party fails to uphold its obligations.

The next section asserts that the government of the United States and of states within that government had failed to uphold their obligations to South Carolina. The specific issue stated was the refusal of some states to enforce the Fugitive Slave Act and clauses in the U.S. Constitution protecting slavery and the federal government's perceived role in attempting to abolish slavery. 

The next section states that while these problems had existed for twenty-five years, the situation had recently become unacceptable due to the election of a President (this was Abraham Lincoln although he is not mentioned by name) who was planning to outlaw slavery. In reference to the failure of the northern states to uphold the Fugitive Slave Act, South Carolina states the primary reason for its secession: 

Further on:

The final section concludes with a statement that South Carolina had therefore seceded from the United States of America and was thus, no longer bound by its laws and authorities.

Legacy
While later claims have been made after the war's end that the South Carolinian decision to secede was prompted by other issues such as tariffs and taxes, these issues were not mentioned at all in the declaration. The primary focus of the declaration is the perceived violation of the Constitution by Northern states in not extraditing escaped slaves (as the U.S. Constitution required in Article IV, Section 2) and actively working to abolish slavery (which South Carolinian secessionists saw as Constitutionally guaranteed and protected). The main thrust of the argument was that since the U.S. Constitution, being a contract, had been violated by some parties (the Northern abolitionist states), the other parties (the Southern slave-holding states) were no longer bound by it. Georgia, Mississippi, and Texas offered similar declarations when they seceded, following South Carolina's example.

The declaration does not make a simple declaration of states' rights. It asserts that South Carolina was a sovereign state that had delegated only particular powers to the federal government by means of the U.S. Constitution. It furthermore protests other states' failure to uphold their obligations under the Constitution. The declaration emphasizes that the Constitution explicitly requires states to deliver "person(s) held in service or labor" back to their state of origin.

The declaration was the second of three documents to be officially issued by the South Carolina Secession Convention. The first was the Ordinance of Secession itself. The third was "The Address of the people of South Carolina, assembled in Convention, to the people of the Slaveholding States of the United States", written by Robert Barnwell Rhett, which called on other slave holding states to secede and join in forming a new nation. The convention resolved to print 15,000 copies of these three documents and distribute them to various parties.

The declaration was seen as analogous to the U.S. Declaration of Independence from 1776, however, it omitted the phrases that "all men are created equal", "that they are endowed by their Creator with certain unalienable Rights", and "consent of the governed". Professor and historian Harry V. Jaffa noted this omission as significant in his 2000 book, A New Birth of Freedom: Abraham Lincoln and the Coming of the Civil War:

Jaffa states that South Carolina omitted references to human equality and consent of the governed, as due to their racist and pro-slavery views, secessionist South Carolinians did not believe in those ideals:

See also

Mississippi Secession Ordinance
Ordinance of Secession
South Carolina in the American Civil War

References 

Books

External links

Full text of the declaration
Texts of the Ordinances and Declarations of Secession of the various Confederate states
Original text of South Carolina Declaration and Ordinance
Original text of Mississippi Declaration

American Civil War
Secession crisis of 1860–61
South Carolina in the American Civil War
American Civil War documents
South Carolina
History of South Carolina
Politics of South Carolina
1860 in South Carolina
December 1860 events
1860 documents